Ansarul Islamic Boys Secondary School also known as"A School," is a government sponsored public secondary school located in Tankoro Chiefdom, Koidutown, Kono District, Sierra Leone.  The school was founded on Islamic Principle in 1974 by two illustrious Fula businessmen, Alhaji Sajalieu Bah, and Alhaji Chewtor Jalloh. The school is an affiliate of the Sierra Leone Ansarul Islamic Mission.  The school's motto is "Service To Mankind." The school is the first and only boys secondary school in Koidutown.  The school is regarded as one of the most prominent Secondary schools in the region. The school's alumni includes medical doctors, theologists, diplomats, politicians, paramount chief, military officers, lawyers, educators, athletes, and business entrepreneurs. Although the school has an Islamic tradition, students from all religious background are accepted, and the staff is made up of teachers from different religious background.

Class rooms, principal's office, Library and Mosque:

The school campus at the moment in Koidu City has eleven structures. One among the structures, towards the east is a library. The library was constructed by the school's alumni association in 2021. South- East of the campus is a computer library and the office of the principal of the senior sector. The school campus is fenced with concrete bricks and a big entrance gate painted black and white representing the uniform color. Outside the fence is a mosque serving both the students and people around the school premises. The rest of the other structures are classrooms and a conference hall.

Centre of campus is used as football field, volleyball field, sporting field, and assembly ground.

Past principals include:

Past Principals include:
F.M. Lamin, 
Mohamed W. Jalloh, and I.S.K. Mansaray.
Sheku Kamara

Current principal:

Abdurahman Bah

Notable alumni
 Dr. Kaifala Marah - Sierra Leone Minister of Finance
 Mr Mb Jalloh Co founder and (PRO) Kono Progressive Union (KPU) Netherland
 Sheikh Saad Jalloh: Chief Imam of the Islamic Cultural Center of New York
 Captain Sadibu Hydara - Former Minister of Interior & Government Spokesman, The Gambia
 Prof Osman Gbla - Dean of Sociology & Law Dept. Fourah Bay College. Also, Chairman of African Union African Peer Review Mechanism, Sierra Leone. 
 Sulaiman Bah - Director of Public Prosecution, Sierra Leone
 Paul Saquee - Paramount Chief, Tankoro Chiefdom, Kono District
 Lt. Said Barrie (late 1991): Sierra Leone Army & Civil War Hero
 Alimu Koula Bah - Former Secretary General of Sierra Leone Football Association (SLFA)
 Mamadi O Jalloh - Community Organizer, New York City, USA
 Dr Ibrahim Diallo - Chiropractor, Maryland, USA
 Peter Baio Kamara: Head of Sierra Leone Anti-Corruption Commission, Eastern Region
 Lamin Bah - Entrepreneur Global clothing Industries L L C ATLANTA- GEORGIA
 Wahab Lera Shaw - Performance Coordinator, Office of the President, Sierra Leone
 Ibrahim Marruf Barrie - Economist, Islamic Development Bank, Jeddah, Saudi Arabia
 Ibrahim Pateh Bah - Member of Parliament, Sierra Leone
 Alhaji Jalloh - Information Attaché, Sierra Leone Embassy, Saudi Arabia 
 Prof. Ibrahim Yusuf Sillah, PhD - Lecturer - King Saud University, Saudi Arabia
 Prince Saquee - Chairman – Sierra Leone Diamond & Gold Dealers Association
 Professor Abu Bakarr Bah, Ph.D.: Professor of Sociology, Northern Illinois University, IL, USA and Editor-in-Chief, African Conflict & Peacebuilding Review.
 Mijau Jalloh - School Principal, Philadelphia, PA, USA
 Abubakarr Bah: Footballer - Leone Stars & Diamond Stars
 Prof Mohamed Jalloh, PhD - Lecturer, Ansarul Islamic College, Freetown, Sierra Leone
 Mohamed K. Mansaray: Founder and Leader of Alliance Democratic Movement (ADM) Party
 Mohamed C. Bah - National Democratic Alliance (NDA) Party, Sanjeev Bah, Presidential Aspirant
 Alimou Diallo - Regional Coordinator, West Africa Network for Peacebuilding (WANEP), Accra-Ghana
 Mohamed Kondeh – Attorney & Human Rights Investigator – United Nations OHCHR, Geneva, Switzerland
 Sheikh Ibrahim Jalloh: Imam, Masjid Al-Ihsaan, Brooklyn, New York
 Sheikh Savane - Imam, Riverside Islamic Cultural Center, New York City
 Dr. Mohamed Alpha Bah- Customer service Advicer, Bahsco Enterprises UK
 Amadu Wurie Barrie - ICT Business Analyst, Department of Human Services (DHS), Canberra
 Mohamed Alpha Siraj Bah. Co-Chairman Minnesota African Task Force Against Ebola. & Executive Director-AMAB Foundation, CEO, Bahsco Global Holdings, Inc. Minnesota, USA

Educational institutions established in 1974
Secondary schools in Sierra Leone
Islamic secondary schools in Africa
1974 establishments in Sierra Leone
Islamic schools in Sierra Leone
Koidu